The Christians is The Christians' 1987 debut album and contained their first five UK hit singles: "Forgotten Town", "Hooverville", "When the Fingers Point", "Ideal World" and "Born Again".

Critical reception

AllMusic has retrospectively been generally favourable towards the album, stating that the band "blend socially conscious lyrics of life under Thatcher with smooth, slickly programmed pop-soul arrangements" and concluding that the record was "a solid debut with very few filler tracks".

Track listing
All tracks written and composed by Henry Priestman except where noted.
 "Forgotten Town" – 5:13
 "When the Fingers Point" – 3:32
 "Born Again" – 5:18
 "Ideal World" (Priestman, M. Henry Herman) – 4:35
 "Save a Soul in Every Town" – 4:32
 "...And That's Why" – 5:17
 "Hooverville" (Priestman, Herman) – 4:45
 "One in a Million" – 4:42
 "Sad Songs" (Priestman, Herman) – 4:25
 "Forgotten Town" (12" Dub Version) – 5:26 (bonus track on cassette and CD)
 "When the Fingers Point" (12" Remix) – 5:32 (bonus track on cassette and CD)
 "Why Waltz" – 4:07 (bonus track on cassette and CD)
On the cassette version of the album the 12" Dub Version of "Forgotten Town" was placed at the end of side one, after "Save a Soul in Every Town".

Personnel
The Christians:
 Garry A. Christian – lead vocals
 Russell Christian – saxophone, vocals
 Henry Priestman – keyboards, guitar, vocals

Additional personnel:
 Mike Bulger – electric guitar
 Tony Jones – bass
 Paul Barlow – drums
 Anthony Moore – programming
 Produced & Engineered by Laurie Latham 
 Additional engineering by Pete Coleman, Stuart Barry 
 Mastered by Tim Young
 Mix on (4) – David Bascombe, Mix on (7) –  Pete Hammond

Charts

References

1987 debut albums
The Christians (band) albums
Albums produced by Laurie Latham
Island Records albums